Squire Horace Reid (11 September 1887 – 29 July 1949) was an Australian politician.

Reid was born in Port Melbourne, Victoria to Captain John Robert Reid, a military officer from Greenock, Scotland, and Hannah Lory. He was educated in Annandale, New South Wales and Albert Park. In 1902, he was employed by the States Cigar Factory where he worked for 25 years until his election to parliament.

He held the seat of Oakleigh in the Victorian Legislative Assembly on two occasions, from 1927 to 1932, when he was defeated by James Vinton Smith, then after regaining the seat, from 1937 until 1947.

After his defeat by John Lechte in 1947, Reid worked as a cigar manufacturer, and was involved in sport administration, serving as president of the Victorian Football Association from 1947 until his death.

References

|-

1887 births
1949 deaths
Members of the Victorian Legislative Assembly
Australian Labor Party members of the Parliament of Victoria
VFA/VFL administrators
Australian people of Scottish descent
20th-century Australian politicians
People from Port Melbourne
Politicians from Melbourne